Edward Warner Moeran (27 November 1903 – 12 December 1997) was a British Common Wealth Party politician who later joined the later Labour Party. He stood as a Parliamentary candidate on five occasions, but won only once.

Moeran first stood for Parliament as the Common Wealth candidate at the Newark by-election in July 1943, when he came a distant third. At the 1945 general election he stood in Thirsk and Malton, again as a Common Wealth candidate. Labour did not contest the seat, and in a two-way contest with the Conservative party candidate, Moeran won 39.9% of the votes.

He subsequently joined the Labour Party, and was elected at the 1950 general election as Member of Parliament (MP) for South Bedfordshire, but was narrowly defeated at the next election, in 1951.  He stood again in 1955, but did not regain the seat.

References

External links 
 
 Common Wealth party archives at the University of Sussex

1903 births
1997 deaths
Common Wealth Party politicians
Labour Party (UK) MPs for English constituencies
UK MPs 1950–1951
People educated at Christ's College, Finchley
Common Wealth Party